"The Food" is the first single by rapper Common released on his sixth album Be. Kanye West appears on the song's chorus and also produces the track. West interpolates "Nothing Can Change This Love" by Sam Cooke for the song's beat. In addition, DJ Dummy scratches on the song and Dave Chappelle introduces the live version of it. The song was originally performed live on Chappelle's Show on March 3, 2004. This live version is featured on Be, although a studio version does also exist.

It received mostly positive acclaim, but was not promoted heavily and did not chart. IGN.com writer Spence D. describes it as a "nice and mild burner that showcases the Chi-town duo's symmetry." Nathan Brackett of Rolling Stone states that it is one of the "hardest-rocking tracks of Common's career."

Track listing

A-side
 "The Food (Dirty)"
 "The Food (Radio)"

B-side
 "The Food (Instrumental)"
 "The Food (Live Version from Chappelle's Show)"

See also
List of Common songs

References

2004 singles
Common (rapper) songs
Kanye West songs
Song recordings produced by Kanye West
Songs written by Kanye West
Songs written by Sam Cooke
Songs written by Eugene Record
GOOD Music singles
Songs written by Common (rapper)
2004 songs